Wafi (وفی spelling in Dari/Farsi, or spelling in Arabic وافي) is an Arabic name that means "reliable", "faithful", "trustworthy", or "loyal". The name may refer to:

Ahmad al-Wafi (766–828), Ismaili imam
Wafi-Golpu mine, Papua New Guinea
Wafi City, United Arab Emirates

Arabic masculine given names